"The Windhover" is a sonnet by Gerard Manley Hopkins (1844–1889). It was written on 30 May 1877, but not published until 1914, when it was included as part of the collection Poems of Gerard Manley Hopkins. Hopkins dedicated the poem "To Christ our Lord".

"Windhover" is another name for the common kestrel (Falco tinnunculus). The name refers to the bird's ability to hover in midair while hunting prey. In the poem, the narrator admires the bird as it hovers in the air, suggesting that it controls the wind as a man may control a horse. The bird then suddenly swoops downwards and "rebuffed the big wind". The bird can be viewed as a metaphor for Christ or of divine epiphany.

Hopkins called "The Windhover" "the best thing [he] ever wrote". It commonly appears in anthologies and has lent itself to many interpretations.  It was recited by the title character in the Simpson's episode Diggs (The Simpsons) "Diggs"

References

External links

"The Windhover" study guide
  (multiple versions)

Poetry by Gerard Manley Hopkins
1877 poems
Victorian poetry